Robert C. Lewis, Jr. (July 12, 1944 – March 23, 2021) was an American amateur golfer from Pepper Pike, Ohio.

Lewis was born in Warren, Ohio. He played college golf at Rollins College, graduating in 1967. He won the 1968 Ohio Amateur on his 24th birthday.

Lewis turned professional and played on the PGA Tour from 1971 to 1974 without much success. He then quit professional golf and had his amateur status reinstated.

As an amateur, Lewis finished runner-up at the 1980 U.S. Amateur and the 1981 and 1984 U.S. Mid-Amateurs. He played on four straight U.S. Walker Cup teams (1981, 1983, 1985, 1987) – all winners. He played on the winning 1982 Eisenhower Trophy team and the 1986 team that finished second.

Lewis captained the 2003 and 2005 Walker Cup teams.

Lewis was inducted into the Ohio Golf Association Hall of Fame in 2002 and the Northern Ohio Golf Association Hall of Fame in 2003.

Lewis died on March 23, 2021, from lung cancer.

Tournament wins
this list may be incomplete
1968 Ohio Amateur
1978 Ohio Open (as amateur)
1987 Northeast Amateur

Results in major championships 

Note: Lewis only played in the Masters Tournament and the U.S. Open.

LA = Low amateur
CUT = missed the half-way cut
"T" = tied

U.S. national team appearances
Amateur
Walker Cup: 1981 (winners), 1983 (winners), 1985 (winners), 1987 (winners), 2003 (non-playing captain), 2005 (non-playing captain, winners)
Eisenhower Trophy: 1982 (winners), 1986

See also
1970 PGA Tour Qualifying School graduates

References

External links
2003 Walker Cup profile

American male golfers
PGA Tour golfers
Amateur golfers
Golfers from Ohio
Rollins Tars athletes
Sportspeople from Warren, Ohio
People from Pepper Pike, Ohio
1944 births
2021 deaths